George Imlay Kidd (25 May 1909 – 21 January 1988) was a Scottish football player who played professionally for Charlton Athletic, Luton Town, and Gillingham, for whom he made over 100 Football League appearances.

References

1909 births
1988 deaths
Footballers from Dundee
Scottish footballers
Charlton Athletic F.C. players
Gillingham F.C. players
Luton Town F.C. players
Association football forwards
English Football League players